Sheykh Koli (also Romanized as Sheykh Kolī; also known as Sheykh Kolá) is a village in Balatajan Rural District, in the Central District of Qaem Shahr County, Mazandaran Province, Iran. At the 2006 census, its population was 1,065, in 261 families.

References 

Populated places in Qaem Shahr County